The personal name Rodney is a toponymic surname derived from the name of an unidentified place near the Somerset/Wiltshire border. 
Rodney became a title of the peerage of Great Britain in 1782, as Baron Rodney. Secondarily, it came to be used as a given name in the 18th century, originally in honour of Admiral George Brydges Rodney, 1st Baron Rodney.

Surnames
 Brenda Solzano-Rodney (born 1962), West Indian cricketer
 Caesar Rodney (1728–1784), lawyer and signer of the Declaration of Independence from Delaware
 Caesar A. Rodney (1772–1824), lawyer and U.S. Senator from Delaware
 Caleb Rodney (1767–1840), merchant and Governor of Delaware
 Daniel Rodney (1764–1846), merchant, Governor and U.S. Senator from Delaware
 Fernando Rodney (born 1977), relief pitcher for the Washington Nationals
 George B. Rodney (1803–1883), lawyer and U.S. Representative from Delaware
 George B. Rodney, Jr. (1842–1927) Governor of Alaska and U.S. Army officer
 George Brydges Rodney, 1st Baron Rodney (1718–1792), admiral in the British Royal Navy
 George Rodney, 2nd Baron Rodney (1753–1802)
 George Rodney, 3rd Baron Rodney (1782–1842)
 Spencer Rodney, 5th Baron Rodney (1785–1846)
 Thomas Rodney (1744–1811), lawyer and Continental Congressman from Delaware
 Walter Rodney (1942–1980), Guyanese historian and politician

Given name
See also: 
 Rodney (wrestler) (born 1971), American professional wrestler
 Rodney Adams (born 1994), American football player
 Rodney Alcala (1943–2021), convicted American rapist and serial killer
 Rodney Allison (born 1956), American football coach
 Rodney Anderson (Wyoming politician) (born 1931), American politician
 Rodney Anderson (born 1968), American politician
 Rodney Anderson (American football) (born 1996), American football player
 Rodney Anoa'i, (1966–2000), American professional wrestler better known as Yokozuna and member of Anoa'i family
 Rodney Ansell (1954–1999), Australian man who inspired the "Crocodile" Dundee films
 Rodney Atkins (born 1969), an American country singer
 Boss Bailey (born 1979), an American football linebacker whose real name is Rodney
 Rodney Bailey (born 1979), an American football player
 Rodney Begnaud (born 1973), American professional wrestler
 Rodney Bewes (1937–2017), English actor
 Rodney Bingenheimer (born 1946), radio disc jockey
 Rod Bonella (1945/46–2000), Australian long-distance runner and horse trainer
 Rod Carew (born 1945), baseball player
 Rodney Carrington (born 1968), comedian and star of Rodney (TV series)
 Rodney Caston (born 1977), American writer
 Rodney Clavell, former South Australian corrections officer and prisoner at Yatala Labour Prison
 Rodney Craig (born 1945), British fencer
 Rodney Dangerfield (1921–2004), comedian
 Rodney Eastman (born 1967), Canadian actor
 Rodney Fox (born 1940), Australian film maker and shark attack survivor
 Rodney P. Frelinghuysen (born 1946), U.S. Representative from New Jersey
 Rodney A. Hawes, Jr. (born 1939), American business executive and philanthropist.
 Rodney Howard-Browne (born 1961), South African, American Evangelist
 Rodney Jack (born 1972), St. Vincent football player
 Rodney Jerkins (born 1977), producer
 Rodney King (1965–2012), African-American whose beating by the LAPD sparked race riots in Los Angeles, California
 Rodney Linderman (born 1963), better known as Rodney Anonymous, of the Dead Milkmen
 Rodney MacDonald (born 1972), Canadian politician and former Premier of Nova Scotia
 Rod McKuen (1933–2015), American singer, poet
 Rodney Marks (born 1956), Australian comedian
 Rodney Marsh (footballer) (born 1944), English footballer
 Rod Marsh (1947–2022), Australian cricketer
 Rodney Matthews (born 1945), English artist and illustrator
 Rodney Mazion (born 1971), American football and baseball player
 Rodney Mullen (born 1966), professional skateboarder
 Rodney Price (born 1972), Jamaican artist
 Rodney Reed (born 1967), American death row inmate
 Rodney Robert Porter (1917–1985), English biochemist
 Rodney Rowland (born 1964), American actor
 Rodney Scott (actor) (born 1978), American actor
 Rodney Scott (baseball) (born 1953), American baseball player 
 Rodney Scott (pitmaster) (born 1971), American chef and whole-hog barbecue pitmaster 
 Rodney Stuckey (born 1986), American basketball player
 Rodney Vandergert (1935–2009), Sri Lankan diplomat
 Rod Wallace (born 1969), English footballer
 Rodney Wallace (American football) (1949–2013), American football offensive lineman
 Rodney Wallace (fighter) (born 1981), American professional mixed martial arts fighter
 Rodney Wallace (footballer) (born 1988), Costa Rican footballer for New York City FC
 Rodney Wallace (Massachusetts politician) (1823–1903), U.S. Representative from Massachusetts
 Rodney Warnakula (born 1961), Sri Lankan actor
 Rodney Williams (disambiguation), multiple people

Fictional characters
 Rodney, a hamster villager in Animal Crossing: New Leaf and New Horizons
 Rodney Copperbottom, character in the movie Robots
 Rodney McKay, character in science fiction television series Stargate Atlantis
 Rodney Trotter, character in British sitcom Only Fools and Horses
 Rodney J. Squirrel, one of the main characters from Squirrel Boy
 Rodney Ford, character from manga and anime series Element Hunters
 Rodney Stone, the narrator of boxing novel Rodney Stone by Arthur Conan Doyle
 Rodney Wilson, a character in the 2012 American comedy movie Wanderlust
 Rodney, character from Total Drama: Pahkitew Island
Sir Rodney, character in the American comic strip The Wizard of Id

See also
 Rodney (disambiguation)
 Rondey Robinson (born 1967), American professional basketball player

References

English masculine given names